Syrians in Germany refers to Syrian immigrants in Germany, or Germans with Syrian ancestry. The number of Syrians in Germany was estimated at around 800,000 people in March 2021, making it the third largest community of foreign nationals (after Turks and Poles). The population consists mainly of refugees of the Syrian Civil War, which began in the 2010s. According to the 2020 German microcensus, the total number of people in Germany with Syrian roots (including non-Syrian nationals) was just over 1 million.

Between 2008 and 2015, the number of migrant employees in German companies grew by 50%. Some other sources claim an estimated 200,000 Syrian citizens reside within Germany as of September 2015. Among German districts, Bonn and Wiesbaden had the highest shares of Syrian migrants in 2011, according to German Census data. In 2018, Germany granted 72% of Syrian refugees protection for the right to work without any setbacks or restrictions.

Migration history
During the European migrant crisis of 2014-2015, hundreds of thousands of Syrian refugees of the Syrian Civil War entered Germany to seek refugee status. The European migrant crisis was eased on September 4, 2015, by Chancellor Werner Faymann of Austria and Chancellor Angela Merkel of Germany. They announced that migrants would be allowed to cross the border from Hungary into Austria and onward to Germany. On the morning of September 5, 2015, buses with migrants began crossing the Austro-Hungarian border.

As of December 31, 2014, the Federal Statistical Office of Germany estimated that there were 118,196 people with Syrian citizenship in Germany.
According to the German Interior Ministry, between January 2015 and October 2015, there were 243,721 Syrian citizens who entered Germany to seek asylum.
Therefore, there were more than 360,000 Syrian citizens residing in Germany as of October 2015. As of 31 December 2016, the total number of Syrians in Germany reached 637,845.

Germany's peak number of asylum applicants peaked at 890,000 in 2015, however, the trend began to reverse. In 2018, only 185,000 Syrians applied for asylum in Germany. Despite the heavy drop in applications, deportations nearly doubled to 20,000 a year, marking a shifting sentiment among the German people away from the welcoming culture that brought thousands of Syrians to Germany since 2015. The changing sentiment among German leaders and citizens towards Syrian refugees comes in light of an increasingly right-wing Parliament. In the 2017 elections, the Alternative für Deutschland (AfD) Party gained seats, bringing far right opposition to immigration to the national stage.

Of the approximately 740,000 Syrians living in Germany, under 1,000 of them voluntarily agreed to return to Syria in 2018. Due to this extremely low rate of return to Syria, there is growing concern amongst Syrian refugees that once the volunteers and criminals are deported from the country, the idea of deportations will be normalized. Some Syrians believe this normalization will lead to a larger wave of deportations that will negatively affect people who can't speak German, don't contribute to the economy, and are unable to fully adapt to the German culture. A large part of the resistance to return to Syria is the ongoing war and Bashar Al-Assad's rule of majority of the country.

Return of Syrian Refugees 
Bashar Al-Assad is the 19th President of Syria and has been in leadership since 2000. He represents and is the regional secretary of the Arab Socialist Baath Party in Syria. He is the commander in chief of the Syrian Armed Forces and states publicly that the millions of citizens fleeing Syria are barred from returning.

In Syria, more than 500,000 people have been killed or gone missing, with roughly 387,118 documented deaths and 205,300 people missing and presumed dead. The Syrian government is responsible for 156,329 deaths, alluding to the danger and fear Syrian refugees have to return to their home country or reunite with their family members. Germany falls under the top ten European countries for asylum applications as refugees seek freedom from the Syrian government, Kurdish forces, the Turkish military, Syrian rebels, the Islamic State, and Jihadist forces.

Syrian refugees travel to Germany seeking safety and community and do not intend on returning to Syria, unless the war is resolved and the various religious groups in Syria reconcile. According to a survey regarding violence and the return of refugees, 18 refugee candidates from different areas of Syria have different perspectives. While 90% of Syrians indicate they are interested in returning to Syria, they believe these conditions need to be resolved first.  88% of candidates were from neighborhoods that were shelled, 92% felt threatened by the armed combat, and 88% had at least one family member or friend who was arrested, injured, or killed. Refugees are also concerned for solidarity, as they must prioritize returning or relocating to a new country with their whole family. Some Syrians leave Syria with no intention of returning and are focused on attaining a European passport rather than fleeing from danger and violence.

The Syrian Refugee Crisis was the result of the Turkish government attempting to alter and renovate their immigration system, so that it would reach international standards akin to those of the European Union. Reforms made during this transformation affected the way Turkish authorities dealt with the situation. They could not manage the inflow of Syrians, which resulted with the problem being left at the will of national organizations working at the ground level, in camps, without larger policy guidance. In the intervening time, formal immigration channels continued to be circumscribed to Europeans, while non-Europeans obtained momentary protection prestige and are anticipated to be assigned to be resettled in a third country.

Originally, the arrival of Syrian refugees in Turkey was moderately small. The crisis started in April 2011 when the Syrian government halted all anti-government protests. They used lethal force to dissipate the crowds, unaffected by the damage they dealt. By mid-summer 2011, around 15,000 Syrians had left the city in search of shelter, resideding at the Syrian border in Hatay Province. They inhabited tent cities, but by the end of July, more than 5,000 had returned to Syria as the circumstances there had settled down. By the end of the year 2011, only 8,000 refugees continued to live in Turkey.

The rate of refugees increased drastically in 2012 as the previous ceasefire attempts had failed.

About 15,000 registered refugees had fled to the Hatay province along with projections of thousands more unregistered refugees fleeing to other provinces by March 2012. In response, Turkish officials started providing more tent cities throughout the southern provinces of Hatay, Kilis, Gaziantep, and Sanliurfa. The situation only escalated when the idea of the ceasefire dissolved in mid-2012. A monthly average of more than 20,000 Syrians subsequently left to seek safety in Turkey. By year end 2012, it was recorded that more than 170,000 Syrian refugees resided in Turkey. The monthly arrival rate had increased during 2013, and by the end of 2014, 55,000 refugees were seeking asylum in Turkey each month. The increase in the rate of refugees was driven by emerging violence from ISIS, which seized territories in Syria and Iraq during the summer of 2014.

Associations

Turkmen

Established in Germany, the "Suriye Türkmen Kültür ve Yardımlaşma Derneği - Avrupa", or "STKYDA", ("Syrian Turkmen Culture and Solidarity Association - Europe") was the first Syrian Turkmen association to be launched in Europe. It was established in order to help the growing Syrian Turkmen community who arrived in the country since the outbreak of the Syrian Civil War. The association includes Syrian Turkmen youth activists from many different Syrian cities and who are now living across Western Europe.

Notable people
Aias Aosman

Mahmoud Dahoud
Mamoun Darkazanli
Rafed El-Masri
Hanin Elias
Adel Karasholi
Yusra Mardini
Sarah Mardini
Rafik Schami
Bassam Tibi
Radwan Yousef 
Mohammed Haydar Zammar

See also
 Syrian diaspora
 Syrians in Austria
 Syrians in Sweden
 Syrians in Norway
 Syrians in Denmark
 Syrians in Turkey
 Arabs in Germany
 Arabs in Berlin
 Arab diaspora
 Arabs in Europe
 Kurds in Germany
 Turks in Germany

References

Arabs in Germany
 
 
Ethnic groups in Germany
Germany
Syrian emigrants to Germany
Middle Eastern diaspora in Germany
Refugees of the Syrian civil war